Shout is the sixth studio album by American new wave band Devo, released on October 9, 1984 by Warner Bros. Records. 

Arriving two years after their previous studio album, Oh, No! It's Devo (1982), the album retained the synth-pop sound of their previous few records, with an extensive focus on the then-new Fairlight CMI Series IIx digital sampling synthesizer. Despite the popularity of synth-pop in 1984, the album was a critical and commercial failure, peaking at only No. 83 on the Billboard 200 and ultimately leading to Warner Bros. dropping the band from their label. Most of the band members have stated that they were not satisfied with the completed album and the band went on hiatus for four years following its release. Although Devo would release two studio albums through Enigma Records, they would not release another studio album through Warner Bros. until Something for Everybody in 2010.

Production
Shout was recorded over a period of ten months between July 1983 and February 1984, in sessions that took place at the Record Plant in Los Angeles, California. 

Gerald Casale has stated that Mark Mothersbaugh purchased the Fairlight CMI with band money and introduced it into the sessions, and that he reluctantly agreed to its use because Depeche Mode had used one. After some experimentation, Casale and other band members were dissatisfied with the results, so he suggested centering the album around the use of bass, drums and guitar, reserving the Fairlight for sequencer lines, "scary sounds" and "abstract element"s. Mothersbaugh eventually rejected this idea, and as a result, Casale began withdrawing from the sessions. 

In a 2007 interview with Billboard magazine, Casale stated that Shout was the biggest regret of his career, "because the Fairlight [synthesizer] just kind of took over everything on that record. I mean, I loved the songwriting and the ideas, but the Fairlight kind of really determined the sound." According to a 2005 interview with the band's guitarist, Bob Mothersbaugh, "Mark and Jerry kept saying in interviews that the guitar was obsolete and wanted to prove it with the Shout album." In 2017, Casale, in response to a question from a fan on Twitter, stated that recording the album was even "too painful to talk about."

Shout was the final studio album by the 1976–1985 line-up of Devo, with their third and most prominent drummer, Alan Myers, leaving the band shortly after the album's release. According to the book We Are Devo, Myers cited a lack of creative fulfillment as his reason for leaving the band, something that he had felt since Devo's move to Los Angeles in the late 1970s. Devo's increased use of drum machines and electronics through the years had greatly reduced Myers' role in the band, although Casale has said that he begged Myers not to leave.

Composition
Warner Bros. initially rejected the album and asked that the band include a cover version, with Casale suggesting the Jimi Hendrix Experience's "Are You Experienced?". "Here to Go" was inspired by artist Bryon Gysin's theory that constant change was the meaning of life and an essential component for humanity. Several songs on the album contain musical quotations from other popular songs.

Artwork and packaging
The album's cover photograph, taken by Karen Filter, is a head shot of Timothy Leary's son Zachary Leary (credited as Zachary Chase) on a composite background with his left hand raised by his open mouth in a "shout" gesture. The album's back cover depicts a head shot photo of guitarist Bob Mothersbaugh's daughter Alex with her eyes focused upwards and her left hand raised by her ear in a listening gesture. It's notably their first studio album since 1978's Q: Are We Not Men? A: We Are Devo! not to feature any of the band's members on the outside cover.

As with every Devo studio album, the band developed a new look for the album, eschewing the black T-shirts and slacks with white "Spud Ring" collars of the Oh, No! It's Devo (1982) period and replacing them with "Chinese-American Friendship Suits."

Promotion
The band was allotted $50,000 to make a music video for "Are You Experienced?". However, the band drew criticism that the video, which featured Hendrix impersonator Randy Hansen emerging from a coffin, was "tasteless" and "disrespectful", which did not aid the album's reception. As a result, the band did not tour to promote the album, leading Warner Bros. to ultimately offer a termination of the band's new six-album contract in exchange for $250,000.

Despite being one of Devo's most visually complex and expensive music videos, "Are You Experienced?" wasn't included on the 2003 DVD music video collection The Complete Truth About De-Evolution (although it had been included on the LaserDisc of the same title issued in 1993). In an interview with Gerald Casale for Ear Candy, he explained:

E.C.: Speaking of de-evolution, why didn't the Hendrix estate give you permission to put the "Are You Experienced?" video on the DVD?

Gerald Casale: Further de-evolution. You understand that the consortium of people that now represent the Hendrix estate are basically run by lawyers; the lawyer mentality. Lawyers always posit the worst-case scenarios. Though that video was loved for years by anybody who saw it including the man who commissioned it —Chuck Arroff, a luminary in the music business, who still claims to this day that it was one of his five most favorite videos ever—, they [the lawyers] didn't get it and assumed we were making fun of Jimi. That's like saying "Whip It" makes fun of cowboys. This is so stupid it's unbelievable.

Abandoned tour
As the band were dropped by both Warner and Virgin following Shouts release, there was no tour to promote it. The group planned to tour in Autumn of 1985, and booked at least one show at the Colston Hall in Bristol, England, but were blocked by their label Enigma, who insisted that if the band were to tour, it would have to be in support of an album released by the label. Devo abandoned the tour in order to record Total Devo, hoping to have it released by early 1986. Their next album wouldn't be released until May 24, 1988, and they would not tour again until October 20 of that year.

Live performances of Shout material are rare, with only two songs from the album ever being played live: the title track, which was a staple of the Total Devo and Smooth Noodle Maps tours; and "Here to Go", performed once in 1991.

In the book Devo Unmasked/Devo the Brand, when discussing the New Traditionalists tour, Mark Mothersbaugh states that during the performance of "Puppet Boy" he would stand atop the framework used on the tour and pretend to pull strings on Bob Mothersbaugh during his guitar solo. Despite this, there is no evidence of "Puppet Boy" having been played on that tour.

Critical reception

Writing for The Village Voice, music journalist Robert Christgau stated, "Marking time (actually, a computer marks it for them), they create the rock—no, new wave—equivalent of baseball's 'Play me or trade me.' I played it. Now I'm trading it."

Mark Deming of AllMusic retrospectively called it a "forgettable, slick and glossy product with all human surfaces stripped away."

Track listingNotes "Growing Pains" was previously released as the B-side to the "Are You Experienced?" single.
 "Shout (E-Z Listening Muzak Version 1)" was previously released on the E-Z Listening Cassette, Volume 2.
 In 2004, Collectables Records re-released Shout on CD with no bonus tracks. The first printing misspelled Gerald Casale's last name as "Casle" and this mistake was corrected in subsequent pressings.
 In 2008, the album was remastered again and released as part of the box set This Is the Devo Box in Japan.

Personnel
Credits adapted from Pioneers Who Got Scalped: The Anthology CD liner notes:Devo Mark Mothersbaugh – vocals, keyboards, guitar
 Gerald Casale – vocals, bass guitar, keyboards
 Bob Mothersbaugh – lead guitar, vocals
 Bob Casale – rhythm guitar, keyboards, vocals
 Alan Myers – drums

Credits adapted from the original album's liner notes:Technical'
 Devo – producer, graphic concept
 Bob Casale – engineer
 Ed Delena – assistant engineer
 Mike Shipley – mixing (tracks 1–9)
 Steve Marcussen – mastering
 Jim Mothersbaugh – technical assistance
 Will Alexander – programming consultation
 Al Horvath – additional Emulator programs
 Bill Wolfer – additional Emulator programs
 Vigon Seireeni – art direction
 Karen Filter – photography
 Effective Graphics – computer graphics
 Zachary Chase – cover kid (boy)
 Alex Mothersbaugh – cover kid (girl)
 Clacton and Frinton – Devo's Chinese-American Friendship Suits

Charts

See also
 List of albums released in 1984
 Devo's discography

References

External links
 

1984 albums
Devo albums
Warner Records albums
Virgin Records albums
Albums recorded at Record Plant (Los Angeles)
Synth-pop albums by American artists